Marshmallow Coasting is an album by Marshmallow Coast, released in 2000.

Critical reception
PopMatters wrote that the album's opening track may contain "the most bizarre mini-intro ever committed to disc." Exclaim! wrote that the "surreal bubble-gum pop hits its mark more often than not and steers clear of the sickly sweet and fey excesses of Of Montreal."

Track listing

References 

2000 albums
Marshmallow Coast albums